Tswana may refer to:
 Tswana people, the Bantu speaking people in Botswana, South Africa, Namibia, Zimbabwe, Zambia, and other Southern Africa regions 
 Tswana language, the language spoken by the (Ba)Tswana people
 Bophuthatswana, the former bantustan for the Tswana people
 Tswana cattle, an indigenous beef cattle breed of Botswana

Language and nationality disambiguation pages